Yekanat Rural District is in Yamchi District of Marand County, East Azerbaijan province, Iran. At the National Census of 2006, its population was 4,308 in 1,075 households. There were 3,882 inhabitants in 1,137 households at the following census of 2011. At the most recent census of 2016, the population of the rural district was 3,272 in 1,016 households. The largest of its 17 villages was Yekan-e Kahriz, with 1,694 people.

References 

Marand County

Rural Districts of East Azerbaijan Province

Populated places in East Azerbaijan Province

Populated places in Marand County